Who Are You?  is the first studio album  by Nico Touches the Walls released on September 24, 2008. The album contains their first major singles, such as "Yoru no Hate", "The Bungy", "(My Sweet) Eden" and "Broken Youth", song chosen as the ending for the anime Naruto Shippuden.

Track listing

Chart positions
The album reached number 11 on Oricon Chart in Japan.

References

Nico Touches the Walls albums
2008 debut albums
Japanese-language albums
Sony Music albums